Insarsky District (Inzaroń ajmak; , Inesaro buje) is an administrative and municipal district (raion), one of the twenty-two in the Republic of Mordovia, Russia. It is located in the south of the republic. Its administrative center is the town of Insar. As of the 2010 Census, the total population of the district was 14,098, with the population of Insar accounting for 61.6% of that number.

Administrative and municipal status
Within the framework of administrative divisions, Insarsky District is one of the twenty-two in the republic. It is divided into one town of district significance (Insar) and fifteen  selsoviets, all of which comprise thirty-three rural localities. As a municipal division, the district is incorporated as Insarsky Municipal District. The town of district significance of Insar is incorporated into an urban settlement, and the fifteen selsoviets are incorporated into fifteen rural settlements within the municipal district. The town of Insar serves as the administrative center of both the administrative and municipal district.

Notable residents 

Nikolay Merkushkin (born 1951 in Novye Verkhissy), former Governor of Samara Oblast, former head of the Republic of Mordovia

References

Notes

Sources



 
Districts of Mordovia